is a former Japanese football player. He played for Japan national team.

Club career
Watanabe was born on April 5, 1954. After graduating from Sendai University, he joined Toyo Industries (later Mazda) in 1977. The club won the 2nd place in 1978 Emperor's Cup. He retired in 1982. He played 81 games and scored 3 goals in the league.

National team career
On June 16, 1979, Watanabe debuted for Japan national team against South Korea. He played 6 games and scored 1 goal for Japan in 1979.

National team statistics

References

External links
 
 Japan National Football Team Database

1954 births
Living people
Sendai University alumni
Japanese footballers
Japan international footballers
Japan Soccer League players
Sanfrecce Hiroshima players
Association football midfielders